Odette Drand (11 March 1927 – 6 January 2019) was a French fencer. She competed in the women's individual foil event at the 1952 Summer Olympics.

References

External links
 

1927 births
2019 deaths
French female foil fencers
Olympic fencers of France
Fencers at the 1952 Summer Olympics